Penelope Mitchell (born 24 July 1991) is an Australian actress best known for playing the roles of Letha Godfrey in the American horror television series Hemlock Grove, and Liv Parker in The Vampire Diaries.

Early life
Born in Melbourne, Victoria to a French-born artist mother and Australian entrepreneur father, Mitchell spent most of her childhood in Australia with her two older brothers. She studied ballet from age 4 to 16.

Mitchell finished in the top 1% of her graduating year, with an International Baccalaureate diploma. She attended Melbourne University, with the intention of becoming a lawyer. Mitchell completed her undergraduate degree in Arts: Media Communication, before moving to Los Angeles to pursue acting.

Penelope is the granddaughter of Lester Mitchell, MBE, and Heather Mitchell, OBE, prominent agriculturalists and political activists. Heather Mitchell was the first female president of the National Farmers Federation, and the co-founder of Landcare Australia, with former Victorian Premier Joan Kirner.

She is a cousin of actress Radha Mitchell.

Career  
She began acting a few years before she landed her role on Hemlock Grove, appearing on shows including Toon Time, an Australian kids show, the ABC (Australia) show Next Stop Hollywood, which followed six Australian actors (including Penelope) who move to Hollywood to audition for pilots, and an episode of Australian police drama Rush.

In the United States, Mitchell is known for her roles on the television series The Vampire Diaries and Hemlock Grove. as well as the films Hellboy and Zipper. She was also recently cast as Renée Picard in the television series Star Trek: Picard.

Filmography

References

External links
 
 
 

21st-century Australian actresses
Australian television actresses
Living people
1991 births
Australian people of French descent
Australian film actresses
Actresses from Melbourne